List of chairpersons of the State Council of the Chuvash Republic. The State Council was preceded by the Supreme Soviet.

List

Chairmen of the Supreme Soviet 1938–1994

Chairpersons of the State Council 1994 – present

Sources
Official website

Politics of Chuvashia
Lists of legislative speakers in Russia